Wangumbaug Lake, also known as Coventry Lake, is a natural lake located in Coventry, Connecticut. The lake holds 2.7 billion gallons (10,220,000 m³) of water. It is fed by springs and has one natural outlet, Coventry Lake Brook, which flows southeast into the Willimantic River. Melt from a retreating glacier formed the lake 13,000 years ago.

Wangumbaug means "Crooked Pond" in Algonquian. It was likely named by the Nipmuc, who settled the area before European contact.

The lake has been a popular summer vacation destination for boaters and bathers. Artists flocked to the summer cottages along the shores. In the early twentieth century, a trolley line connected the towns of Coventry and Willimantic, and Wangumbaug Lake became known as "Willimantic's summer resort." A pavilion known as the Lakeside Casino was a popular dance hall. Wangumbaug Lake is currently the home of the UConn Huskies rowing team, which shares its boathouse with the Edwin O. Smith High School crew team from nearby Mansfield.

A two-acre lake island, Underwood Island, is located 100 yards from Wangumbaug's shoreline. The village and census-designated place of Coventry Lake includes the lake and surrounding residential areas. The regional climate is hemiboreal.

References

External links 

 Lake Wangumbaug: A Coventry Crown Jewel

Coventry, Connecticut
Lakes of Connecticut
Lakes of Tolland County, Connecticut
Connecticut placenames of Native American origin
Geography of Tolland County, Connecticut
Tourist attractions in Tolland County, Connecticut